This list of museums in Minnesota encompasses museums which are defined for this context as institutions (including nonprofit organizations, government entities, and private businesses) that collect and care for objects of cultural, artistic, scientific, or historical interest and make their collections or related exhibits available for public viewing. Non-profit and university art galleries are also included.

Private museums which are not regularly open to the public and virtual museums which exist only online are not included.

Current museums

Regions defined

Northwest Minnesota Region
Counties: Becker, Beltrami, Clay, Grant, Kittson, Lake of the Woods, Mahnomen, Marshall, Norman,  Pennington, Polk, Red Lake, Roseau

Northeast Minnesota Region
Counties: Aitkin, Carlton, Clearwater, Cook,  Itasca, Kanabec, Koochiching, Lake, Mille Lacs, Pine, Saint Louis

West Minnesota Region
Counties: Douglas,Otter Tail, Pope,  Stevens, Traverse, Wilkin

Central Minnesota Region
Counties: Benton, Cass, Crow Wing, Hubbard, Morrison, Stearns, Swift, Todd, Wadena

Minnesota River Valley Region
Counties: Big Stone, Blue Earth, Brown, Chippewa, Kandiyohi, Lac Qui Parle, Le Sueur, Martin, McLeod,  Meeker, Nicollet, Redwood, Renville, Sibley, Swift, Yellow Medicine

Twin Cities Metro Region
Counties: Anoka, Carver, Chisago, Dakota, Hennepin, Isanti, Scott, Sherburne, Washington, Wright

Southwest Minnesota Region
Counties:  Cottonwood, Faribault, Jackson,  Lincoln, Lyon, Murray, Nobles, Pipestone, Rock, Watonwan

Southeast Minnesota Region
Counties: Dodge, Fillmore, Freeborn, Goodhue, Houston, Mower, Olmsted, Rice, Steele, Wabasha, Waseca, Winona

Defunct museums
 Amdal House Museum, Lake Park, MN, was sold in 2015 and the collections of the Lake Park Area Historical Society moved to a new location.
 Arches Museum of Pioneer Life, Lewiston.  Collection transferred to the Rural Heritage Museum in St. Charles.
 Arrowhead Bluffs Museum, Wabasha.  Closed in October 2011. Displayed hunting trophies, antique rifles, and Native American artifacts.
 Baseball Museum, Minneapolis.  Baseball memorabilia collected by a Minnesota Twins equipment manager and displayed in a souvenir shop near the Metrodome.  Closed in 2015.
 College of Visual Arts Gallery, Saint Paul.  Gallery space of the former College of Visual Arts, which closed in 2013.
 Grand Mound History Center, near International Falls. Interpreted the prehistoric Grand Mound.
 The Le Sueur Museum in Le Sueur, Minnesota, United States, was sold by the Le Sueur County Historical Society in January 2018 to the dairy cooperative Agropur Inc. which in has applied for a permit to demolish the building.
 Mikkelson Collection, Willmar. Collection auctioned off in 2012.
 Midwest Music Museum, Bloomington.  Was located at the Mall of America, no current information.
 Minnesota African American Museum, Minneapolis.  Started in October 2012 in the historic Coe Mansion but never fully opened to the public. It was to display exhibits surrounding Minnesota's African-American community.
 Minnesota State Fair History Museum was replaced with the Minnesota State Fair History & Heritage Center which opened in 2014.
 Monongalia Historical Museum, New London, Minnesota housed in the former Lebanon Church. The Monongalia Historical Society vacated the building in November 2013. The building was demolished in June 2014.
 Museum of Questionable Medical Devices, Minneapolis.  Closed in 2002 and collection transferred to the Science Museum of Minnesota.
 Planes of Fame East Air Museum, Eden Prairie.  A WWII aviation museum that housed a collection of 30+ historic, flyable airplanes.  Closed in 1997.  Most airplanes transferred to the Palm Springs Air Museum.
 Rifle Sport Gallery, Minneapolis.  An underground art space open 1985-1988 on Block E.
 Sinclair Lewis Interpretive Center, Sauk Centre.  Property sold for development in 2016, collection moved to Sinclair Lewis Boyhood Home and temporary storage.
 Soderlund Pharmacy Museum, St. Peter.  Medical instruments, pharmacological products, and show globes, plus a 1911 soda fountain, housed in a working drugstore.  Closed as of 2014.
 Spicer's Classic Car Museum, Chisholm.  No current information.
 Story Lady Doll & Toy Museum, Albert Lea.  When it closed in 2010, the collection was moved to the Freeborn County Historical Museum.
 TRACES Center for History and Culture, Landmark Center, Saint Paul.  Interpreted the prisoner of war experience, closed November 2008.
 Wells Fargo History Museum in Minneapolis, MN was permanently closed along with 11 of 12 Wells Fargo History Museums around the country in 2020.

See also
 List of museums in the United States
 Aquaria in Minnesota (category)
 Astronomical observatories in Minnesota (category)
 Botanical gardens in Minnesota (category)
 List of nature centers in Minnesota
 Zoos in Minnesota (category)

References

External links

Historical Museum Guide for Minnesota
Minnesota Historical & Genealogical Societies
Minnesota Valley History Learning Center: Historical Sites - most are open by appointment

Minnesota
Museums
 
Museums